Red Spur is a narrow rock spur, 2 nautical miles (3.7 km) long, descending from southern Wisconsin Plateau to Olentangy Glacier 1 nautical mile (1.9 km) north of Tillite Spur. Mapped by United States Geological Survey (USGS) from surveys and U.S. Navy air photos, 1960–64. The name was proposed by John H. Mercer, United States Antarctic Research Program (USARP) geologist to this area in 1964–65, because the surface of a flat platform on this spur is weathered bright red.
 

Ridges of Marie Byrd Land